John Tyndall McCutcheon (March 23, 1892 – August 9, 1971) was an American politician in the state of Washington. He served in the Washington House of Representatives and Washington State Senate.

References

1892 births
1971 deaths
Republican Party members of the Washington House of Representatives
20th-century American politicians
Politicians from Tacoma, Washington
People from Steilacoom, Washington
Republican Party Washington (state) state senators